St Anne's College Boat Club (SABC) is a rowing club for members of St Anne's College, Oxford. It is based on the Isis at Boathouse Island, Christ Church Meadow, Oxford, Oxford.

History
Originally the boat club was restricted to an allocated space within the St John's College boathouse. In 1985 new boathouse plans were submitted with the help of a major donation from Peter de Savary. The boathouse was subsequently built in 1989/90, on a plot next to many other University boathouses on Boathouse Island. The boathouse building is in three sections and shared with Wadham College Boat Club and St Hugh's Boat Club with St Annes's in the centre section.

See also
University rowing (UK)
Oxford University Boat Club
Rowing on the River Thames

References

Rowing clubs of the University of Oxford
St Anne's College, Oxford
Rowing clubs in Oxfordshire
Rowing clubs of the River Thames
Sport in Oxford
Rowing clubs in England